Reina Regente was a protected cruiser built for the Spanish Navy in the 1900s, the only member of her class. She had a very lengthy construction period, being laid down in 1899, launched in 1906, and finally completed in 1908. Reina Regentes career was uneventful, the result of limited naval budgets and Spain's neutrality during World War I. In the early 1920s, she was employed as a training ship until she was discarded in 1926.

Design
She displaced . Her coal-fired boilers, the number of which and their type are not known, were trunked into three funnels. Her crew numbered 497 officers and enlisted men, and she was fitted with two pole masts equipped with fighting tops.

The ship was armed with a main battery of ten  TR  guns that were manufactured by Schneider-Creusot. Four were mounted in twin gun turrets, one mounted on either end of the ship, with the remainder in casemates in the upper deck. The turret guns were carried in individual cradles, which allowed them to be elevated and fired independently. Her secondary battery consisted of twelve 6-pounder guns and a pair of 1-pounders. She also carried eight machine guns. Her armament was rounded out by three torpedo tubes. Her conning tower was protected by the same thickness of armor plate.

Service history
Reina Regente was built in Ferrol, Spain; she was proposed in 1896, laid down in 1899, and launched on 20 September 1906. Fitting-out work proceeded slowly, and the ship finally entered service in 1908, after nearly a decade of construction. In the aftermath of Spain's defeat in the Spanish–American War of 1898, the country's economy proved to be too weak to support a significant naval expansion program. As a result, Reina Regente was the last cruiser built for the Spanish Navy for nearly two decades, until the light cruiser  was laid down in 1915.

The ship travelled to Britain in June 1911 to represent the country at the coronation fleet review for the new king, George V, held at Spithead on the 24th. The fleet included vessels from fifteen other countries in addition to the Royal Navy. On 15 November 1911, Reina Regente was present in Gibraltar for a port call made by George V during his trip to India. Spain remained neutral during World War I, and Reina Regentes service during the conflict was uneventful compared to her foreign contemporaries. In the post-war period, she was used as a training ship and sent on overseas cruises. The ship was eventually stricken from the naval register in 1926 and broken up for scrap.

Notes

References

 
 
 
 
 
 

1906 ships
Ships built in Spain
Cruisers of the Spanish Navy